The Martyrdom of Saint Catherine is a c. 1606 oil on canvas painting by Guido Reni, considered one of his most important early works and now held in the Diocesan Museum in Albenga.

Commission, dating and subject

Description and style

Versions

References

External links
 
 

Paintings by Guido Reni
1606 paintings
Paintings in Liguria
Paintings of Catherine of Alexandria
Angels in art